The 2016 Fort Hays State Tigers football team represented Fort Hays State University in the 2016 NCAA Division II football season. The Tigers played their home games at Lewis Field Stadium in Hays, Kansas, as they have done since 1936. 2016 was the 111th season in school history. The Tigers were led by sixth-year head coach, Chris Brown. Fort Hays State has been a member of the Mid-America Intercollegiate Athletics Association since 2006.

Preseason
The Tigers entered the 2016 season after finishing 8–4 overall, 8–3 in conference play last season under Brown. On August 2, 2016 at the MIAA Football Media Day, the Tigers were chosen to finish in sixth place in the Coaches Poll, and fifth in the Media Poll.

Personnel

Coaching staff
Along with Brown, there were 10 assistants.

Roster

Schedule

Source:

Game notes, regular season

Missouri Southern

Central Missouri

Central Oklahoma

Northeastern State

Lindenwood

Pittsburg State

Washburn

Missouri Western

Emporia State

Northwest Missouri State

Nebraska–Kearney

Game notes, post-season

Eastern New Mexico

References

Fort Hays State
Fort Hays State Tigers football seasons
Fort Hays State Tigers football